SR-71 was an American rock band formed in Baltimore, Maryland. They are best known for their 2000 single "Right Now", their 2002 single "Tomorrow", and as the original authors of Bowling for Soup's 2004 hit "1985" (which was released first on their album Here We Go Again). The name of the band came from SR-71 Blackbird, a supersonic surveillance aircraft of the United States Air Force. The band was originally known as Honor Among Thieves, and as was later the case with SR-71, lead singer Mitch Allan was the only constant member.

History

Early years and Now You See Inside (1996–2001)
The band was formed in 1996, as a continuation project for frontman Mitch Allan after the demise of his previous band, Honor Among Thieves. The band chose the name "SR-71" because all the members' parents came from the United States Air Force. The band was quickly signed to RCA Records, where they recorded their debut album, entitled Now You See Inside which was released on June 20, 2000, and produced by David Bendeth (Underoath, Killswitch Engage), Gil Norton (Foo Fighters, Pixies) and John Shanks (Unwritten Law, Jane's Addiction). The album proved successful for the unknown band, and peaked at number 81 on the Billboard 200 and number 2 on the Billboard Heatseekers Chart. The album spawned the band's debut hit single, which remains the band's only hit single to date, "Right Now". Written by frontman Mitch Allan and songwriter Butch Walker from  a raw script purchased for $1500 from a friend, it reached number 2 on the Modern Rock Tracks chart, number 102 on the Billboard Hot 100 and number 38 on the Mainstream Rock Tracks.

The band's original drummer, Dan Garvin, left the band soon after the supporting tour of the album, to join alternative rock outfit Nine Days while their drummer was unable to perform on the supporting tour for The Madding Crowd.

Tomorrow, drop from RCA Records and Reid departure and death (2002–2003)
All of 2002, the band recorded their follow-up to Now You See Inside. In the recording sessions for the album, they recorded a cover of the Grammy Award-winning funk rock song "Let It Whip", originally by the Dazz Band, for the soundtrack of the movie The New Guy.

Their second studio album, entitled Tomorrow, was released on October 22, 2002, and was produced by Neal Avron (Fall Out Boy, Yellowcard), Butch Walker (American Hi-Fi, Avril Lavigne), David Bendeth (Underoath, Breaking Benjamin) and frontman Mitch Allan himself. On this album, Mitch Allan contributed songwriting to all the songs in the album, with most of them written only by him, except a few, written along with Butch Walker, Kevin Kadish, and the other members of the band. It was the band's first album with new drummer John Allen.

The album was much darker, and proved to be less successful than its predecessor, and peaked only at number 138 on the Billboard 200. The first single "Tomorrow", reached only number 18 on the Modern Rock Tracks chart, which was far less successful than "Right Now's" number 2 peak. The song "My World" was later recorded for American Idol runner-up Bo Bice's debut album The Real Thing, where frontman Mitch Allan played guitar and bass on. The song "Goodbye" was used by WWE as the theme song for the 2004 edition of WWE No Way Out.

Despite the commercial failure, RCA still heavily promoted a supporting tour for the album from late 2002 until 2003. The tour also proved unsuccessful.  Soon tensions began to arise in the band, resulting in the departure of guitarist Mark Beauchemin and bassist Jeff Reid after the end of the tour in 2003. Reid left for medical reasons, believing he had lung cancer. Reid died from the cancer on June 11, 2004. He was 36 years old. Mark Beauchemin went on playing guitar for soft rock artist Vanessa Carlton.

The band was then joined by new members guitarist Pat DeMent and bassist Mike Ruocco, only to be dropped by their label, RCA Records, not long afterward.

Here We Go Again and decline in popularity (2003–2005)
Though without a label at the time, the band went on to record an album of new material by themselves, during mid to late 2003. All songwriting on the album was done by Mitch Allan, with the exception of two tracks co-written by drummer John Allen, and one old-penned hidden track co-written a year earlier by Kevin Kadish. All production, mixing and mastering was also done by Mitch Allan.

In 2004, the band finally found a new label, a Japanese label under the name Crown Japan, who released their third album Here We Go Again on May 21, 2004, in Japan only. The album was available outside Japan only through imports on the band's official website. The album gained little attention and entered no charts, proving to be, again, a commercial flop. Despite that, one song on the album, "1985", was then re-recorded by the band's close friends Bowling for Soup for their album A Hangover You Don't Deserve, released later in 2004. "1985" was released as a single and reached number 23 on the Billboard Hot 100. Frontman Mitch Allan and drummer John Allen were still credited for the song on the Bowling for Soup album and single, along with Bowling for Soup frontman Jaret Reddick. It was former SR-71 producer and collaborator Butch Walker who produced the album and single. Mitch Allan also had a cameo in BFS's music video for "1985".

The album's title track "Here We Go Again" was also re-recorded in 2006, by pop punk band JParis for their album Call It What You Want. Mitch Allan has produced the band's album and was credited as the writer of this song.

The first song on the album, "Axl Rose", was released as a single later, with "Here We Go Again" and "All American" as B-sides. The Peter Gabriel cover "In Your Eyes" was also released a single, and played frequently during the 2004–05 tour by the band.

Hiatus and Mitch Allan solo album (2006–2009)
Though the band still played some dates in 2005, it stayed inactive since, with Mitch Allan starting to play small solo club shows around 2006. At his solo shows, he played SR-71 songs, as well as some previously unreleased solo material, including a new fan favorite song called "Superman". Allan then announced that he started working on his first solo album. He said the album will be called Clawing My Way to the Middle and released in late 2007, with sessions commencing in Los Angeles and Baltimore in the spring of 2006 with record producer Ben Moody. Since it was announced the album would be released in late 2007, it was pushed back a few times in 2008 and 2009, and now it is unknown when or if the album will be released.

Allan kept playing solo club shows around the Hollywood area through 2007, when the band announced that they will be officially going into an indefinite hiatus after a one last show in Henderson, Nevada, on August 18, 2007, at the Sunset Station, along with Vertical Horizon, Nine Days and Marcy Playground.

While keeping a low profile on performances, Mitch Allan has worked as a songwriter and record producer with many artists including Lindsay Lohan, Lovehammers, Daughtry, Hilary Duff, Faith Hill, Backstreet Boys and more. In 2007, Allan received a Latin Grammy Award nomination for co-writing the song "Bella Traición" for Mexican teen sensation Belinda.

In January 2008, Mitch Allan released his debut single with a music video on his Myspace page. The song, titled "Make Me High" was a soft remake of an old SR-71 song called "My World", from their 2002 album Tomorrow. Allan has also said that the SR-71 song "Mosquito" from their 2004 album Here We Go Again will also be re-recorded for his solo album. Allan said he was working with his former SR-71 bandmates on his solo album.

In 2009, Allan launched a weekly event in Hollywood where he and other notable songwriters meet up and play covers and original tunes acoustically to small crowds. Allan was then involved, along with former Evanescence guitarist Ben Moody in a new contest for finding a teen singer sensation.

Also in 2009, drummer John Allen was involved as the lead singer of the new hard rock band Charm City Devils. The band toured as part of Mötley Crüe's Crüe Fest 2 tour in summer 2009. Their first album Let's Rock and Roll, included one song co-written and produced by Mitch Allan.

Reunion (2009–2010)
On July 25, 2009, the band reunited for a one-off performance at the Wicker Park Bucktown Arts and Music Festival in Chicago, playing a full set on the Center Stage.

On October 13, 2009, Mitch Allan announced on his Myspace page that SR-71 will be playing another one-off reunion show at the Bourbon Street in hometown Baltimore, Maryland on November 25, 2009. Alternative rock act Cinder Road supported them on this date. During the band's show, drummer John Allen stepped to the front and traded duties with frontman Mitch Allan, to sing "Best of the Worst", a song he co-wrote with Mitch Allan for his other band Charm City Devils, which members also got on stage to play the song.

On October 22, 2010, Allan, through his Twitter account, revealed that SR-71's third album, Here We Go Again, would finally be released in the United States. On Thanksgiving Day, 2010, the album was made available as a digital download. The original album tracks were remastered and three live bonus tracks were added. Following this, the band's status went inactive.

Musical style and influences
SR-71 has been described as punk rock, pop punk, and alternative rock. SR-71 cites the Beatles, Queen, Sum 41,  U2, the Clash, Sex Pistols, Third Eye Blind, Stone Temple Pilots, the Who, the Police, and Duran Duran as influences. The band's album Now You See Inside was described as pop punk and pop rock. SR-71's second album Tomorrow has been described as nu metal.

Band members

Final-lineup
 Mitch Allan – lead vocals, rhythm guitar 
 John Allen – drums, percussion, backing vocals 
 Pat DeMent – lead guitar, backing vocals 
 Mike Ruocco – bass, backing vocals 

Former members
 Mark Beauchemin – lead guitar, keyboards, backing vocals 
 Jeff Reid – bass, keyboards, backing vocals 
 Dan Garvin – drums, percussion, backing vocals

Discography

Studio albums

Compilation appearances
Cool Traxx! 2 (2000) – "Last Man on the Moon"
Listen to What the Man Said (2001) – "My Brave Face"
Loser Soundtrack (2000) – "Right Now"
A Very Special Christmas 5 (2001) – "Christmas Is the Time to Say I Love You"
Splashdown Soundtrack (2001) – "Right Now"
Crossing All Over Vol. 13 (2001) – "Right Now"
The New Guy Soundtrack (2002) – "Let It Whip"
Slap Her... She's French (2002) – "Right Now"
The song "Right Now" also appears in the PlayStation 2 game Splashdown.

Singles

 Notes
 A. "Right Now" peaked outside of the top 100 in the US Billboard Hot 100, therefore they are listed on the Bubbling Under Hot 100 Singles.

References 

Pop punk groups from Maryland
Musical quartets
Musical groups established in 1998
Musical groups disestablished in 2010
Rock music groups from Maryland
Alternative rock groups from Maryland
American punk rock groups